Leonardo Massoni (born 17 February 1987) is an Italian footballer who plays for Italian club Massese.

Biography
Born in Pietrasanta, the Province of Lucca, Massoni started his career at Lucca team Lucchese. He spent 2 seasons loaned to Viareggio in 2006–07 and 2007–08 season, winning Serie D and remain in Serie C2 by winning the relegation playoffs in 2008. After the bankrupt of Lucchese he was signed by Serie B team Sassuolo but farmed back to Viareggio in co-ownership deal, rejoining Lucchese teammate Maikol Benassi and Luca Ruglioni. He played 28 league matches that season and played both legs of promotion playoffs. Despite the team finished as the losing semi-finalists, Viareggio promoted to fill the vacancies left by the bankrupted teams on 30 July. On 25 June Sassuolo bought him back but re-sold to Prima Divisione team Verona in another co-ownership deal, for €50,000 along with Sassuolo teammate Filippo Pensalfini and Andy Selva. He only played 6 times in the league and 1 more in the promotion playoffs. On 12 July 2010 Viareggio re-signed Massoni and also borrowed Davide Bertolucci from Verona. He almost played all the matches for Viareggio, only missed 3 league matches due to suspensions. In the cup he played 3 out of 6 possible matches. He started in the relegation playoffs, partnered with Lorenzo Fiale, winning Cosenza in aggregate.

On 24 June 2011 Sassuolo bought Massoni back for a peppercorn of €500, in 2-year contract.

Honours
 Serie D: 2007

References

External links
Football.it Profile 

Italian footballers
S.S.D. Lucchese 1905 players
F.C. Esperia Viareggio players
Hellas Verona F.C. players
U.S. Sassuolo Calcio players
S.S. Virtus Lanciano 1924 players
Association football central defenders
People from Pietrasanta
1987 births
Living people
Sportspeople from the Province of Lucca
Footballers from Tuscany